See also: Portugal - History of Portugal - List of Portuguese monarchs

First Dynasty: The Burgundians

Second Dynasty: Houses of Aviz

Third Dynasty: Houses of Habsburg

Fourth Dynasty: House of Braganza

Portugal, Kings of
Family tree
Portugal, Kings of